Dichomeris symmetrica is a moth in the family Gelechiidae. It was described by Kyu-Tek Park and Ronald W. Hodges in 1995. It is found in Taiwan.

The length of the forewings is 6-6.2 mm. The forewings are pale greyish orange with scattered fuscous scales. The hindwings are pale grey.

References

Moths described in 1995
symmetrica